This is a list of major Hindu temples in India, by state.

Andhra Pradesh 

There are around 4,000 large temples in Andhra Pradesh state

 Ahobilam
 Alipiri
 Amararama
 Annavaram Satyanarayana Temple
 Bugga Ramalingeswara Swamy Temple, Tadipatri
 Chintalarayaswami Temple 
 Draksharama
 Govindaraja Temple, Tirupati
 Kalyana Venkateswara Temple, Narayanavanam
 Kalyana Venkateswara Temple, Srinivasamangapuram
 Kanaka Durga Temple, Vijayawada
 Kapila Theertham
 Kodandarama Temple, Tirupati
 Konetirayala Temple, Keelapatla
 Kotappakonda
 Ksheerarama
 Kulandeshwara Temple
 Kumararama
 Kurmanathaswamy temple, Srikurmam 
 Lakshmi Narasimha Swamy Temple, Penna Ahobilam
 Lakshmi Narasimha Temple, Antarvedi 
 Lakshmi Narasimha Temple, Mangalagiri
 Mallikarjuna Temple, Srisailam
 Mantralayam
 Chennakesava Swamy Temple, Markapur
 Sri Mukhalingam, Srikakulam
 Padmavathi Temple
 Pallikondeswara Temple, Surutupalle
 Prasanna Venkateswara Temple, Appalayagunta
 Ranganatha Temple, Nellore
 Siddeswara kshetram
 Siddheswara Swamy Temple
 Somarama
 Sri Sunama Jakini Matha Temple, Gooty, Anantapuramu
 Srikalahasteeswara Temple
 Suryanarayana Temple, Arasavalli
 Suryanarayana Temple, Gollala Mamidada
 Varaha Lakshmi Narasimha Temple, Simhachalam
 Varahaswamy Temple, Tirumala
 Vedadri Narasimha Temple, Vedadri
 Vedanarayana Temple, Nagalapuram
 Veerabhadra Temple, Lepakshi
 Veeranjaneya Temple, Ardhagiri
 Venkateswara Temple, Dwaraka Tirumala
 Venkateswara Temple, Tirumala
 Vinayaka Temple, Kanipakam
 Sri Yaganti Uma Maheswara Temple, Yaganti

Arunachal Pradesh 

 Parshuram Kund
 Rangnuwk hum

Assam

 Bhairabi Temple, near Tezpur
 Dah Parvatiya
 Dhekiakhowa Bornamghar
 Dirgheshwari temple, Guwahati
 Doul Govinda Temple, Guwahati
 Hatimura Temple, Silghat
 Hayagriva Madhava Temple, Hajo
 Kamakhya Temple, Guwahati
 Ketakeshwar Dewal, Tezpur
 Madhab Than
 Mahabhairav Temple, Tezpur
 Mahamaya Dham, Dhubri district
 Malinithan
 Navagraha temples, Guwahati
 Negheriting Shiva Doul, Dergaon
 Rangnath Dol
 Rudreswar Temple, Guwahati
 Sivasagar Sivadol
 Sukreswar Temple, Guwahati
 Tamreswari Temple
 Ugratara Devalaya, Guwahati

Bihar

Aami Mandir
Baba Mukteshwarnath Dham, Deohar
Baba Garib Sthan Mandir
Bari Sangat Bihar
Budhi Mai
Burhanath temple
Maa Tara Chandi Temple
Chandika Sthan, Munger
ISKCON Temple Patna
Kapileshwar Temple
Khudneshwar Asthan Morwa
Lal Keshwar Shiv Temple, Bagmusha, Hajipur
Mahavir Hanuman Temple, Patna
Mangla Gauri Temple
Mittheswarnath Shiv Temple, Darbhanga District
Mundeshwari Temple
Pataleshwar Mandir, Hajipur
Patan Devi
Parasmaninath Temple
Ramchaura Mandir, Hajipur
Shitla Mata Temple, Patna
Shri Adinath Akhara
Sita Kund
Thawe Mandir
Ugna Mahadev, Bhawanipur
Viraat Ramayan Mandir
Vishnudham Mandir
Vishnupad Temple, Gaya

Chandigarh

 Chandi Mandir

Chhattisgarh

* Ashtabhuji Temple
 Bambleshwari Temple, Dongargarh
 Barfani Dham
 Bhoramdeo Temple, Kawardha
 Danteshwari Temple, Dantewada
 Dudhadhari Temple
 Ganga Maiya
 Maa Bagheshwari Devi Temple, Kudargarh, Surajpur
 Laxman Temple, Sirpur
 Maa Pitambara (Bagalamukhi) Temple - Amleshwar
 Mahadev Temple, Deobaloda - Deobaloda, Durg
 Mahamaya Temple, Ambikapur, Surguja
 Mahamaya Temple, Ratanpur, Bilaspur
 Mata Kaushalya Temple
 Rajiv lochan Vishnu temple, Rajim
 Sarvamangla, Korba

Delhi

* Akshardham
 Chhatarpur Temple
 Chittaranjan Park Kali Mandir
 Hanuman Temple, Connaught Place
 ISKCON Temple Delhi
 Jagannath Temple, Delhi
 Jhandewalan Temple
 Kalka Mandir, Delhi
 Laxminarayan Temple (Birla Mandir)
 New Delhi Kali Bari
 Nili Chhatri
 Shani Dham Temple
 Uttara Guruvayurappan Temple
 Uttara Swami Malai Temple
 Yogmaya Temple

Goa

 Mahadev Temple, Tambdi Surla
 Mandodari Temple, Betki
 Shri Damodar Temple, Zambaulim

Gujarat

 Ahmedabad Kali Bari
 Atmajyoti Ashram
 Bahuchara Mata
 Becharaji
 Bhalka
 Bhavnath Temple, Mau
 Bhavnath
 Camp Hanuman Temple
 Chotila
 Dwarkadhish Temple
 EME Temple
 Girnar
 Gorthiya Mahadev Temple
 Hanuman temple, Salangpur
 Jagannath Temple, Ahmedabad
 Kalika Mata Temple, Pavagadh
 Nageshvara Jyotirlinga
 Navlakha temple, Ghumli
 New Swaminarayan temple, Bhuj 
 Radha Damodar Temple, Junagadh
 Rudra Mahalaya Temple
 Rukmini Devi Temple
 Sadhimataji temple
 Santram Mandir
 Shamlaji
 Shiva temple, Kera
 Shri Keshavraiji Temple, Bet Dwarka
 Someshwar Mahadev Temple
 Somnath temple
 Sun Temple, Modhera
 Swaminarayan Akshardham (Gandhinagar)
 Swaminarayan Mandir, Gadhada 
 Swaminarayan Temple, Ahmedabad
 Umiya Temple, Unjha

Haryana

 Agroha Dham
 Bhuteshwar Temple
 Brahma Sarovar, Kurukshetra
 Jyotisar, Kurukshetra
 Kartikeya Temple, Pehowa
 Mata Mansa Devi Mandir
 Pindara Temple
 Sannihit Sarovar, Kurukshetra
 Sthaneshwar Mahadev Temple

Himachal Pradesh

 Aadi Himani Chamunda, Kangra
 Baba Balak Nath
 Baijnath Temple, Baijnath
 Bajreshwari Mata Temple, Kangra, Nagarkot, Kangra Himachal Pradesh
 Bijli Mahadev, Kullu, Himachal Pradesh
 Hidimba Devi Temple, Manali
 Manimahesh Kailash Peak, Chamba, Himachal Pradesh
 Masrur Temples, Kangra
 Raghunath Temple, Kullu
 Trilokpur temple

Jammu and Kashmir

Jammu Division

 Raghunath Mandir, Jammu
 Vaishno Devi, Katra

Kashmir Division

 Amarnath Cave Temple, Anantnag
 Hari Parbat, Srinagar
 Kheer Bhawani Temple , Ganderbal
 Khrew, Pulwama
 Martand Sun Temple,  Anantnag
 Shankaracharya Temple, Srinagar

Jharkhand

 Baidyanath Temple, Deoghar
 Bindudham
 Chhinnamasta Temple, Rajrappa
 Gayatri Gyan Temple
 Harihar Dham
 Jagannath Temple
 Karneshwar Dham
 Maa Dewri Temple
 Maluti temples
 Shree Banshidhar Radhika Ji Mandir
 Sri Sri Kalika Maharani Temple

Karnataka

 

 Aihole 
 Amrutesvara Temple, Amruthapura, at Amrutapura near Chikmagalur
 Annapoorneshwari Temple, Horanadu
 Badami cave temples
 Badami
 Bhoganandishwara Temple
 Bhutanatha group of temples, Badami
 Chamundeshwari Temple, Mysore
 Cheluvanarayana Swamy Temple, Melukote
 Chennakeshava Temple, Belur
 Chennakeshava Temple, Somanathapura
 Devarayanadurga
 Dharmaraya Swamy Temple, Bangalore
 Dharmasthala Temple, Dharmasthala
 Dodda Basavana Gudi
 Doddabasappa Temple, Dambal
 Domlur Chokkanathaswamy temple
 Gavi Gangadhareshwara Temple
 Ghati Subramanya Temple, Doddaballapur
 Gokarna
 Halebidu
 Hampi
 Hoysaleswara Temple
 ISKCON Temple, Bangalore
 Kodlamane Shree Vishnumurthy Temple, Uttara Kannada
 Kukke Subramanya Temple
 Kukke Subramanya Temple
 Lakshmi Narasimha Temple, Bhadravati
 Mookambika temple, Kollur
 Murudeshwara
 Nagadevatha
 Nellitheertha Cave Temple
 Pattadakal
 Ragigudda Anjaneya Temple
 Ranganathaswamy Temple, Srirangapatna
 Shree Vishnumurthy Temple
 Sirsi Marikamba Temple
 Sri Sai Mandir, Belgaum
 Sri Venkataramana Temple, Karkala
 Srikanteshwara Temple, Nanjangud
 Sharadamba Temple, Sringeri
 Udupi Sri Krishna Matha, Udupi
 Virupaksha Temple, Hampi

Kerala

 Ambalappuzha Sri Krishna Temple
 Ananthapura Lake Temple
 Aranmula Parthasarathy Temple
 Pisharikav Temple, Koyilandy
 Arattupuzha Temple
 Attukal Temple
 Chakkulathukavu Temple
 Chettikulangara Devi Temple
 Chottanikkara Temple
 Ettumanoor Mahadevar Temple
 Ernakulam Shiva Temple
 Guruvayur Temple
 Kadampuzha Devi Temple
 Kanadikavu Shree Vishnumaya Kuttichathan Swamy temple
 Kodungallur Bhagavathy Temple
 Koodalmanikyam Temple
 Kottiyoor Temple
 Koodalmanikyam Temple
 Lokanarkavu Temple
 Mannarasala Snake Temple
 Muthappan Temple
 Oachira Temple
 Padmanabhaswamy Temple
 Payammal Shatrughna Temple
 Pazhavangadi Ganapathy Temple
 Peruvanam Mahadeva Temple
Pisharikavu Temple, Koyilandy
 Rajarajeshwara Temple
 Sabarimala Temple
 Sree Poornathrayeesa Temple
 Sreenarayanapuram Temple
 Thirumoozhikkulam Lakshmana Perumal Temple
 Thirunakkara Mahadevar Temple
 Thrikodithanam Mahavishnu Temple
 Thirunelli Temple
 Thiruvanchikulam Temple
 Thriprayar Temple
 Tirunavaya Temple
 Vadakkunnathan Temple
 Vaikom Mahadevar Temple
 Vazhappally Maha Siva Temple

Madhya Pradesh

 Bijasan Mata Temple Indore, Indore
 Chaturbhuj Temple (Orchha), Orchha
 Chintaman Ganesh Temple, Ujjain
 Dada Darbar, Khandwa
 Devi Jagadambi Temple, Khajuraho
 Devi Vaishini Temple, Dewas
 Gajanan Maharaj Temple, Indore
 Jatashankar, Pachmarhi
 Kal Bhairav Temple, Ujjain
 Kandariya Mahadeva Temple
 Kandariya Mahadeva Temple, Khajuraho
 Khajrana Ganesh Temple, Indore
 Khajuraho Group of Monuments
 Mahakaleshwar Jyotirlinga Ujjain
 Sharda Devi Temple Maihar satna
 Omkareshwar Temple
 Pashupatinath Temple, Mandsaur
 Pitambara Peeth, Datia
 Ram Raja Temple, Orchha Near Jhansi
 Sasbahu Temple, Gwalior
 Shri Kala Bhairava Nath Swami Temple, Adegaon
 Shyam Kaka Temple, Rajgarh district
 Kankali Devi temple, Tigawa
 Tulsi Peeth, Chitrakoot

Maharashtra

 Akkalkot Swami Samarth 
 Ambreshwar Temple, Ambarnath 
 Hiranyakeshi temple, Amboli, Sindhudurg
 Amruteshwar Temple, Ratanwadi
 Aundha Nagnath Temple, Hingoli
 Babulnath Temple, Mumbai
 Balaji Temple, Navi Mumbai 
 Ballaleshwar Pali
 Bhagwant Temple, Barshi
 Bhimashankar Temple
 Bhuleshwar Temple
 Birla Mandir, Shahad 
 BAPS Shri Swaminarayan Mandir, Ambegaon
 Red Jogeshwari Temple, Pune
 Chakreshwar Mahadev Mandir, Nalasopara
 Chandika Devi Temple, Juchandra
 Chaturshringi Temple, Pune
 Chintamani Temple, Theur
 Dagadusheth Halwai Ganapati Temple, Pune
 Dashabhuja Temple, Pune
 Durgadi Fort Temple, Kalyan
 Ekvira Mata Mandir, Lonavla
 Elephanta Caves, near Elephanta Island, Mumbai
 Kailash Temple at Ellora
 Ganapati Temple, Redi 
 Moreshwar Temple, Morgaon
 Ganpati Temple, Tasgaon
 Ganpatipule, Ratnagiri 
 Girijatmaj Temple of Lenyadri 
 Gondeshwar Temple, Sinnar
 Nagra Temple, Gondia
 Grishneshwar temple, Ellora
 Harihareshwara Temple
 Harishchandragad, Ahmednagar district
 Palasnath Temple, Indapur
 ISKCON Temple, Pune
 Jivdani Mata Temple, Virar 
 Jogeshwari
 Jyotiba Temple at Wadi
 Kala Ram Temple, Nasik
 Kasba Ganapati, Pune
 Khandoba Mandir, Beed
 Khandoba Temple, Jejuri 
 Khidkaleshwar Mandir, Dombivli
 Kopineshwar Mandir, Thane
 Kukdeshwar Temple 
 Mahalakshmi Temple, Dahanu
 Mahalakshmi Temple, Kolhapur 
 Mahalakshmi Temple, Mahalakshmi, Mumbai
 Mahur Renuka Mata Temple 
 Mandher Devi Temple in Mandhradevi 
 Mankeshwar temple, Zodage
 Markanda Mahadev, Chamorshi
 Morya Gosavi Temple, Chinchwad
 Mumba Devi Mandir, Mumbai
 Mumbra Devi Temple, Mumbra 
 Narsobawadi
 Padmalaya
 Parshuram Temple, Chiplun
 Parvati Hill, Pune
 Pataleshwar Caves, Pune
 Patit Pavan Mandir, Ratnagiri
 Prabhadevi Temple, Prabhadevi, Mumbai
 Ram Mandir, Mumbai
 Mahaganpati Temple of Ranjangaon
 Saptashrungi
 Sarasbaug Ganpati
 Satpuda Manudevi Temple, Adgaon
 Shani Shingnapur
 Shirdi
 Shiv Mandir, Maharashtra
 Shree Swaminarayan Temple Mumbai
 Shri BrahmaChaitanya Gondavalekar Maharaj, Gondavale
 Shri Dev Rameshwar Mandir 
 Shri Laxmi Narsimha Temple, Nira Narsingpur 
 Shri Laxmi Narsimha Temple, Nira Narsingpur, Pune
 Shri Swaminarayan Mandir, Mumbai 
 Siddheshwar & Ratneshwar Temple
 Siddhivinayak Mahaganapati Temple
 Siddhivinayak Temple, Mumbai
 Siddhivinayak Temple, Siddhatek
 Tryamboli Temple Temblaiwadi, Kolhapur
 Trimbakeshwar Shiva Temple, Trimbakeshwar
 Tulja Bhavani Temple, Tuljapur 
 Tulshibaug, Pune
 Vajreshwari Temple, Vajreshwari
 Varadvinayak
 Vigneshwara Temple, Ozar 
 Vithoba Temple, Pandharpur

Manipur

 Ningthoukhong Gopinath Mandir
 Shree Govindajee Temple, Imphal
 Shri Radha Raman Temple of Kanchipur, Kanchipur

Meghalaya 

Nartiang Durga Temple, West Jaintia Hills district

Odisha

 Ajaikapada Bhairava Temple
 Ananta Shayana
 Ananta Vasudeva Temple
 Annakoteshvara Temple
 Astasambhu Siva Temples
 Baitala Deula
 Baladevjew Temple
 Bhagabati Temple, Banapur
 Bharati Matha
 Bhattarika Temple
 Bhringesvara Siva Temple
 Biraja Temple, Jajpur
 Brahma Temple, Bindusagar
 Brahmeswara Temple
 Budha Deula
 Byamokesvara temple
 Chakreshvari Siva Temple
 Chakresvara Tank
 Charchika Temple
 Chateshwar Temple
 Cuttack Chandi Temple
 Dhabaleswar
 Dharakote
 Dishisvara Siva Temple
 Durga Temple, Motia
 Gupteswar Cave
 Harihara Deula, Boudh
 Harishankar Temple
 Jagannath Temple, Baripada, Mayurbhanj
 Jagannath Temple, Koraput, Sabara Srikhetra in Koraput
 Jagannath Temple, Nayagarh, Nayagarh
 Jagannath Temple, Puri
 Jaleswar Siva Temple Precinct
 Kakatpur Mangala Temple
 Kalabhairavi Temple
 Kalikadevi Temple
 Kapilash Temple
 Kapilesvara Siva Temple
 Kedareswar Temple
 Khiching
 Khirachora Gopinatha Temple, Remuna, Balasore
 Kichakeshwari Temple
 Konark Sun Temple, Konark
 Lankeswari Temple, Sonepur
 Lingaraj Temple
 Lokanatha Temple
 Maa Taratarini Temple, Adi Shakti Pith, Ganjam
 Maa Tarini Temple, Ghatgaon, Kendujhar
 Maa Ugra Tara
 Madneswar Siva Temple
 Mahabhoi Sasana Tank
 Mahakala-Mahakali Temple
 Mahavinayak Temple
 Mahendragiri, Orissa
 Mangalesvara Siva Temple
 Manibhadresvara Siva Temple – I
 Manibhadresvara Temple – II
 Manikeshwari Temple
 Manikeshwari Temple, Bhawanipatna, Kalahandi
 Markandeshwar Temple
 Markandeshwar Temple
 Mausimaa Temple
 Mukteshvara Temple, Bhubaneswar
 Nagesvara Temple, Bhubaneswar
 Narayana Gosain Temple
 Narayani Temple
 Nilamadhav Temple
 Nilkantheswar Shiva temple
 Nrusinghanath Temple
 Pabaneswara temple
 Panchalingeshwar
 Papanasini Siva Temple
 Parsurameswar Temple
 Parvati Temple
 Paschimesvara Siva Temple
 Patalesvara Siva Temple – I
 Patalesvara Siva Temple – II
 Patalesvara Siva Temple – III
 Patali Srikhetra, Subarnapur
 Raghunath Temple, Odagaon
 Rajarani Temple
 Ram Mandir, Janpath
 Ramachandi Temple
 Rameshwar Deula
 Sakshigopal Temple
 Samaleswari Temple
 Sanisvara Siva Temple
 Saptamatruka Temple
 Sarala Temple
 Simhanath Temple
 Sivatirtha Matha, Old Town
 Subarnameru Temple
 Subarnesvara Siva Temple
 Suka Temple
 Sukutesvara Temple
 Sundaresvara Siva Temple
 Sureswari temple
 Svapnesvara Siva Temple
 Swarnadhisvara Siva Temple
 Talesavara Siva Temple – II
 Talesvara Siva Temple
 The Leaning Temple of Huma
 Tirthesvara Siva temple
 Upper Bagh Devi Temple
 Uttaresvara Siva Temple
 Varahi Deula, Chaurasi
 Vishnu Temple, Bhubaneswar
 Visvanatha Shiva Temple, Bhubaneswar
 Yajna Nrisimha Temple
 Yameshwar Temple
 Yamesvara Tank (Nala Kunda)

Punjab

 Devi Talab Mandir, Jalandhar
 Durgiana Temple, Amritsar
 Golden Temple, Amritsar
 Jayanti Devi Temple, Mohali
 Julfa Mata Temple, Nangal
 Maiser Khana, Bathinda
 Mukteshwar Mahadev Temple, Pathankot
 Shanaleshwara Swayambhu Temple, Rajpura
 Shri Kali Devi Temple, Patiala
 Suraj Kund Sunam

Rajasthan

 Ambika Mata Temple
 Baba Mohan Rama Temple, Kali Kholi, 
 Birla Mandir, Jaipur
 Bohra Ganesh temple
 Brahma Temple, Pushkar
 Shri Charbhuja temple, Rajsamand District
 Eklingji Mahadev Temple
 Govind Dev Ji Temple, Jaipur
 Jagdish temple
 Jeen Mata Temple
 Kaila Devi Temple, Kaila devi, Karauli
 Kalika Mata Temple, Chittorgarh Fort, 
 Karni Mata Temple, Deshnoke
 Khatu Shyam Temple khatu
 Khatushyamji
 Kyarda Hanumanji Temple, Hindaun City
 Madan Mohan Temple, Karauli
 Mehandipur Balaji Temple, Todabhim
 Moti Dungari Temple, Jaipur
 Nakkash Ki Devi - Gomti Dham, Hindaun City
 Neemach Mata Temple
 Osian, Jodhpur
 Salasar Balaji Temple, Salasar
 Sanwaliaji temple
 Sundha Mata Temple
 Tanot Mata Temple

Sikkim

 Hanuman Tok, Gangtok
 Kirateshwar Mahadev Temple, Legship
 Thakurbari Temple, Gangtok

Tamil Nadu 
 
There are more than 33,000 ancient temples in Tamil Nadu.

 Anjaneya Temple, Nanganallur
 Annamalaiyar Temple
 Ardhanareeswarar temple, Tiruchengode, Namakkal
 Arulmigu Manneaswarar Temple, Annur
 Arulmigu Munthi Vinayagar Temple
 Bannari Amman Temple 
 Bhaktha Anjaneyar
 Brahmapureeswarar Temple
 Brihadeeswarar Temple at Thanjavur
 Ekambaranathar Temple
 Gangaikonda Cholapuram Temple
 Gomathi Amman
 Iskcon Temple, Chennai 
 Jalakandeswarar Temple, Vellore
 Jambukeswarar Temple, Thiruvanaikaval
 Kapaleeshwarar Temple
 Karpaka Vinayakar Temple
 Koniamman Temple, Coimbatore
 Koodal Azhagar temple
 Manakula Vinayagar Temple
 Marudhamalai Subramanya Swami Temple, Coimbatore
 Meenakshi Amman Temple 
 Mondaicaud Bhagavathi Temple
 Nagaraja Temple, Nagercoil
 Nageswaraswamy Temple, Kumbakonam
 Namakkal_Anjaneyar_Temple
 Narasimhaswamy_Temple,_Namakkal
 Natadreeswarar Temple
 Nellaiappar Temple, Tirunelveli
 Oppliyappan Temple
 Pachaimalai Subramanya Swamy Temple
 Palani Murugan Temple
 Parthasarathy Temple, Chennai
 Pazhamudhircholai Temple
 Perur Pateeswarar Temple, Coimbatore
 PunnaiNallur Mariamman temple
 Ramanathaswamy Temple
 Ranganathaswamy Temple, Srirangam
 Samayapuram Mariamman Temple, Samayapuram
 Sangameswarar Temple
 Sangameswarar Temple
 Sankaranaraya swamy temple
 Shore Temple
 Sikkal Singaravelan Temple
 Sri Navaladi Karuppannaswami Temple – Mohanur
 Srivilliputhur Andal Temple
 Sundararaja_Perumal_temple
 Swamimalai Murugan Temple
 Thanumalayan Temple
 Thillai Nataraja Temple
 Thindal Murugan Temple
 Thiruchendur Murugan Temple
 Thiruthani Murugan Temple
 Thyagaraja Temple, Tiruvarur
 Tirunallar Dharbaranyeswarar Temple
 Tirupparankunram Murugan Temple
 Tiruppukkozhiyur
 Ucchi Pillayar Temple 
 Vaitheeshwaran Temple near Mayuram
 Vandiyur Mariamman Temple
 Vedapureeswarar Temple, Puducherry
 Veeraraghava Swamy Temple, Tiruvallur
 Vriddhagiriswarar Temple, Vriddhachalam

Telangana

 Alampur Jogulamba Temple
 Alampur Navabrahma Temples
 Ananthagiri Temple
 Ashtalakshmi Temple
 Bhadrakali Temple
 Birla Mandir, Hyderabad
 Chaya Someswara Temple
 Chilkoor Balaji Temple
 Dichpally Ramalayam
 Erakeswara Temple, Pillalamarri
 Gnana Saraswati Temple, Basar
 Hare Krishna Golden Temple, Hyderabad
 Hyderabad Kalibari
 Jagannath Temple, Hyderabad
 Jamalapuram Temple
 Kaleshwara Mukteswara Swamy Temple
 Karmanghat Hanuman Temple
 Keesaragutta Temple 
 Komuravelli Mallikharjuna Temple
 Kondagattu Anjaneya Swamy Temple
 Kothakonda_Jatara
 Kuchadri Venkateshwara Swamy Temple
 Kolanupaka Jain Temple
 Lakshmi Narasimha Temple, Dharmapuri
 Padmakshi Temple
 Raja Rajeswara Temple, Vemulawada
 Ramappa Temple
 Ranganathaswamy Temple, Jiyaguda
 Sammakka Saralamma Jatara
 Sanghi Temple
 Saraswati Temple, Wargal
 Sita Ramachandraswamy Temple, Bhadrachalam
 Sitaram Bagh temple
 Sri Lakshmi Narasimha Swamy Temple, Yadadri
 Sri Peddamma Thalli Temple
 Surendrapuri
 Thousand Pillar Temple
 Ujjaini Mahakali Temple

Tripura

 Agartala Jagannath Mandir
 Chaturdasha Temple
 Lakshmi Narayan Temple, Agartala
 Tripura Sundari Temple
 Unakoti

Uttarakhand

 Badrinath Temple, Badrinath
 Baleshwar Temple, Champawat
 Binsar Mahadev, Pauri Garhwal
 Chandi Devi Temple, Haridwar
 Daksheswar Mahadev Temple, Kankhal
 Gangotri
 Garjiya Devi Temple, near Ramnagar
 Golu Devata, Chitai
 Gopinath Mandir, Chamoli Gopeshwar
 Gundiyat Gaon
 Guptakashi
 Gurudwara Shri Hemkund Sahib, near Govindghat
 Har Ki Pauri, Haridwar
 Jageshwar
 Kalpeshwar
 Karnaprayag
 Kedarnath Temple, Kedarnath
 Madhyamaheshwar
 Mahasu Devta Temple
 Mansa Devi Temple, Haridwar
 Maya Devi Temple, Haridwar
 Moteshwar Mahadev, Kashipur
 Nandaprayag
 Neelkanth Mahadev Temple, near Rishikesh
 Rishikesh
 Rudranath
 Surkanda Devi, near Mussoorie
 Triyuginarayan Temple
 Tungnath
 Ukhimath

Uttar Pradesh

 Alopi Devi Mandir, Allahabad
 Bankey Bihari Temple, Vrindavan
 Bharat Mata Mandir, Mahatma Gandhi Kashi Vidyapith campus, Varanasi
 Dwarkadheesh temple, Mathura
 Gorakhnath Math, Gorakhpur
 Govardhan Shila
 Hajari Mahadev Temple, Etawah
 Hanuman Garhi Temple
 JK Temple, Kanpur
 Kashi Vishwanath Temple, Varanasi
 Krishna Balrama Mandir
 Krishna Janmasthan Temple Complex, Mathura
 Kusum Sarovar
 Lodheshwar Mahadev Mandir, Barabanki
 Mankameshwar Temple, Allahabad
 Nidhivan, Vrindavan
 Prem Mandir, Vrindavan
 Radha Damodar Temple, Vrindavan
 Radha Krishna Vivah Sthali, Bhandirvan
 Radha Kund
 Radha Madan Mohan Temple, Vrindavan
 Radha Raman Temple
 Radha Rani Temple, Barsana
 Radha Vallabh Temple, Vrindavan
 Ram Mandir, Ayodhya
 Sankat Mochan Hanuman Temple, Varanasi
 Swaminarayan Temple, Chhapaiya, Basti
 Ved Mata Gaytri Mandir
 Vindhyachal, Mirzapur
 Waneshwar Mahadev Temple

West Bengal

Ananta Basudeba Temple, Bansberia
Bakreswar Temple, Birbhum
Bargabhima Temple, Tamluk
Begunbari Kali Temple
Belur Math, Belur
Bhavatarini Shmashanpith Kali Temple
Birla Mandir, Kolkata
Dakshineswar Kali Temple
Dwadash Shiva Temples
Firinghi Kalibari
Fullara, Birbhum
Hangseshwari Temple, Bansberia
ISKCON Temple, Mayapur
Kalighat Kali Temple
Kalyaneshwari Temple, Bardhaman
Lake Kalibari, Kolkata 
Madangopal Jiu Temple , Samta
Mahakal Temple, Darjeeling
Radha Madhab Temple
Ramrajatala Temple, Howrah
Rasmancha, Bishnupur
Shobhabazar Lal Mandir
Taraknath Temple, Tarakeswar
Tarapith Temple, Birbhum
Thanthania Kalibari

See also
 Lists of Hindu temples by country

References

 Vastu-Silpa Kosha, Encyclopedia of Hindu Temple architecture and Vastu S.K.Ramachandara Rao, Delhi, Devine Books, (Lala Murari Lal Chharia Oriental series)  (Set)

External links

Hindu temples